Álvaro Benito Villar (born 10 December 1976) is a Spanish retired footballer who played as a left midfielder,  currently vocalist/guitarist of Rock band Pignoise.

Club career
Born in Salamanca, Castile and León, Benito emerged through Real Madrid's youth ranks, making his senior debut not yet aged 18 with the C team. He progressed to the reserves the following year.

Benito was relatively used by the main squad in the 1995–96 season, and contributed seven matches the following campaign as they were crowned La Liga champions. In November 1996, he suffered a severe knee injury from which he would never fully recover, undergoing three operations in only four months in 1998 in Pittsburgh, United States; he was involved in a car accident afterwards, which further curtailed his recovering process.

After one unassuming loan with CD Tenerife and another spell with Castilla, Benito was released by Real Madrid in summer 2002, joining city neighbours Getafe CF of Segunda División. He appeared rarely for his new club, again due to injury.

After retiring, Benito was in charge of several of Real's youth sides, starting with the Alevín B in 2015. He was dismissed in late February 2019, following criticism of the first team after a 0–3 home defeat against FC Barcelona in the semi-finals of the Copa del Rey on a radio show.

International career
Benito won his only cap for the Spain under-21 side on 12 November 1996, coming on as a late substitute for FC Barcelona's Roger García in a 1–1 home draw against Slovakia for the 1998 UEFA European Championship qualifiers, but being stretchered off shortly after with a serious injury that all but ended his career.

Musical career
During his rehabilitation period, Benito started playing guitar and writing songs, going on to put together a band, Pignoise. The group, which also featured another former footballer, Héctor Polo (Real Zaragoza, Rayo Vallecano), eventually used many of the songs he composed prior to its creation.

Honours
Real Madrid
La Liga: 1996–97

Spain U16
UEFA European Under-16 Championship runner-up: 1992

References

External links

Official Pignoise website 

1976 births
Living people
Sportspeople from Salamanca
Spanish footballers
Footballers from Castile and León
Association football midfielders
La Liga players
Segunda División players
Segunda División B players
Real Madrid C footballers
Real Madrid Castilla footballers
Real Madrid CF players
CD Tenerife players
Getafe CF footballers
Spain youth international footballers
Spain under-21 international footballers
Real Madrid CF non-playing staff
Musicians from Castile and León
Rock en Español musicians
Spanish rock singers
21st-century Spanish singers